Diamant (1916)  is a 1916 Dutch silent film directed by Johan Gildemeijer.

Cast
 Louis Bouwmeester - Mozes
 Esther De Boer-van Rijk - Mozes´ vrouw / Mozes´ wife
 Meina Irwen - Pleegkind / Foster child
 August Van den Hoeck - Echte vader van het pleegkind / Real father of the foster child
 Theo Van Vliet
 Jozef Orelio

External links 
 

1916 films
Dutch silent feature films
Dutch black-and-white films